The Brazen Beauty is a 1918 American silent comedy film directed by Tod Browning. It is not known whether the film currently survives, which suggests that it may be a lost film.

Cast
 Priscilla Dean as Jacala Auehli
 Gertrude Astor as Mrs. Augusta Van Ruysdael
 Thurston Hall as Kenneth Hyde
 Katherine Griffith as Aunt Ellen
 Alice Wilson as Kate Dewey
 Leo White as Tony Dewey
 Hans Unterkircher as Bruce Edwards (credited as Thornton Church)
 Rex De Rosselli
 Edith Roberts as Undetermined Role (uncredited) (unconfirmed)

Reception
Like many American films of the time, The Brazen Beauty was subject to cuts by city and state film censorship boards. For example, the Chicago Board of Censors required, in Reel 4, cuts of two scenes and the flashing of three scenes of a young woman in a boat where her gown was considered indecently low.

References

External links

1918 films
1918 comedy films
American black-and-white films
American silent feature films
Silent American comedy films
Films directed by Tod Browning
Universal Pictures films
1910s American films